Serdtse (Russian: Сердце) means heart in Russian and may refer to
Cape Serdtse-Kamen, a headland on the northeastern coast of Chukotka, Russia
Serdtse (song) by Vasily Lebedev-Kumach
Serdtse ty moe, a 2007 album by Sofia Rotaru 
Heart of a Dog (Sobachye serdtse), a 1925 novel by Mikhail Bulgakov
Heart of a Dog (1988 film) based on the Bulgakov's novel